The Four Larks were an R&B group that recorded from the 1960s through to the 1970s on various record labels. Their singles have been released on at least ten different record labels. They had a hit on the pop charts with "It's Unbelievable".

Background
The Larks were originally started by Weldon McDougal. In 1954, with himself singing bass, and along Calvin Nichols, Mary Archer and brothers Clarence and Bill Blalock, he formed a group called The Victors. Mary Archer was soon replaced by Herman Green. By the end of the year McDougal joined the marines and had a group with the same name while in still in the marines. Having left the service in 1958, he went about reforming The Victors. The only member he could get was  Calvin Nichols. He managed to bring in Jackie Marshall, a high tenor. News got out which attracted the attention of Baritone Bill Oxendine who joined up. McDougal's wife Cleopatra also joined up and the group's membership became five. He also changed the name of the group to The Larks after seeing a brand of nails called Lark.

Career
In 1961, "It's Unbelievable" was released on the Sheryl label. The Sheryl released came about as a result of Weldon running into Atlantic Records promo man Jerry Ross. After the auditioning for Ross, the Larks recorded around six tracks. The backing band was called The Manhattans and was made up of keyboardist Ruben Wright, guitarist Johnny Stiles, sax player Harrison Scott and drummer Norman Conners.  Wright was formerly with Philadelphia group The Capris and had written their hit God Only Knows. In 1961, it entered the charts at no 78 for the Week Ending 1 January. It eventually rose to no 69 on the Billboard pop charts.

Their last released was on the Uptown label with "Keep Climbing Brothers" bw "It's Unbelievable" in 1969.

Later years
Weldon McDougal would later become a producer and work for Motown. He also has a place in history by paving the way for the Philly Sound.

Discography

References

External links
 The Other, Other Larks, article by Marv Goldberg

African-American musical groups
American rhythm and blues musical groups
American vocal groups
Musical groups from Philadelphia
Doo-wop groups
Musical groups established in 1958
1958 establishments in Pennsylvania